Cho Sung-hoon (born 3 April 1964) is a South Korean cross-country skier. He competed at the 1984 Winter Olympics and the 1988 Winter Olympics.

References

External links
 

1964 births
Living people
South Korean male cross-country skiers
Olympic cross-country skiers of South Korea
Cross-country skiers at the 1984 Winter Olympics
Cross-country skiers at the 1988 Winter Olympics
Place of birth missing (living people)
Asian Games medalists in cross-country skiing
Cross-country skiers at the 1986 Asian Winter Games
Cross-country skiers at the 1990 Asian Winter Games
Asian Games silver medalists for South Korea
Medalists at the 1986 Asian Winter Games
Medalists at the 1990 Asian Winter Games
20th-century South Korean people
21st-century South Korean people